The 2013 Constellation Cup was the 4th Constellation Cup series played between Australia and New Zealand. The series, also known as the New World Netball Series, featured five netball test matches, played in September and October 2013. The Australia team was coached by Lisa Alexander and captained by Laura Geitz. New Zealand were coached by Waimarama Taumaunu and captained by Casey Kopua. New Zealand won the opening match before Australia leveled the series. After winning the third test, Australia took a 2–1 series lead. Australia clinched the series with a 52–47 win in the fourth test. After winning the fifth test, Australia finished 4–1 series winners.

Squads

Australia

New Zealand

Debuts
 Courtney Tairi made her senior debut for New Zealand in the first test on 15 September 2013.
 Shannon Francois made her senior debut for New Zealand in the third test on 4 October 2013.

Matches

New World Netball Series

First test

Second test

Third test

Fourth test

Fifth test

References

2013
2013 in New Zealand netball
2013 in Australian netball
September 2013 sports events in New Zealand
October 2013 sports events in Australia